Shree Mahadevappa Mailara Railway Station - Haveri commonly Haveri railway station is a main railway station in Haveri district, Karnataka. Its code is HVR. It serves Haveri town. The station consists of three platforms.

References 

Mysore railway division
Railway stations in Haveri district